Sarkar Sahab is a TV serial based on the culture of cholistan desert and modern Dubai. The serial is directed by Kamran Qureshi & Iram Qureshi, written by Seema Ghazal and produced by Humayun Saeed & Abdullah Kadwani's production house 7th Sky Entertainment.

The serial was shot in Noor Mahal (Palace) and Darbar Mahal (Palace) of Bahawalpur, Derawar Fort, Chanan Peer shrine and Khanqah Sharif shrine showing the old cultural values and family traditions. The English title of the serial is Evicted Lord and it was broadcast on ARY TV. It is a story of a family that is divided through contradictions, expectations and traditions.
The show was also aired on Star One in India .

Plot
Sarkar Sahab (Asif Raza Mir) is very positive and soft-spoken noble Lord living in a palace in cholistan with his wife Shahi (Deeba) and two sons, Habeel (Kashif Mehmood) and Balaaj (Imran Abbas). Sarkar Sahab's younger brother Lord Meer Alam (Nayyar Ejaz) and his wife Surayya (Fariha Akbar) have two daughters and don't have any son.

Qudsia, elder daughter of Meer Alam, is married to Habeel. Doctor tells her that she will not be able to become a mother. Now Shahi wants Habeel to do second marriage for child. Zena (Madiha Iftikhar), younger daughter of Mir Alam, is an energetic and lively girl. She loves Balaaj since her childhood. Balaaj is studying abroad and there he falls in love with another girl Salina (Zainab Qayyum).

Gul Ara (Nirma) was a professional dancer who was invited from Karachi to perform in a Sarkar's family event and her mother traps Sarkar Sahab in a situation that he has to marry Gul Ara. Shahi asks him to leave the palace and Habeel with the help of Meer Alam takes over all the business affairs.

Balaaj marries Salina in Dubai and here Shahi fixes his wedding date in Bahawalpur. He is called a day before wedding to give him surprise by showing an emergency over the phone that his mother is critically ill. On arrival Balaaj refuses to marry and informs Zena that he is already married. Zena begs him to do it as a paper marriage, just to show people and make the family happy.

Salena gets pregnant and gives birth to a baby boy. She phones Bhawalpur to let Balaj know this happy news when Gul Ara answers and helps her financially in the absence of Balaj and also helps to come to Bahawalpur. Meer Habeel and Balaaj malign Gul Ara and convince Sarkar Sahab by showing documents that she is doing fraud by slowly selling all the property to get her thrown out of home.

Shahi accepts Sarkar Sahab back in palace. Salina goes to palace and entire family gets shocked. Salina's son is accepted as heir. Shahi brings Gul Ara in palace to live together after proving her innocence by Sarkar's trustworthy staff member Saim Ali (Faiq Khan).

Cast

Main cast 
 Asif Raza Mir as Mir Sarkar Sahab
 Imran Abbas as Mir Balaaj
 Kashif Mehmood as Mir Habeel
 Nirma as Gul Aara 
 Zainab Qayyum as Salina
 Deeba as Shahi
 Madiha Iftikhar as Zena
 Nayyar Ejaz as Mir Alam Sahab 
 Fareeha Jabeen as Surayya
 Sonu Ali as Qudsia

Supporting cast 
 Faiq Khan as Saim Ali 
 Parveen Akbar as Rani Bi
 Raju Jamil as UAE Sheikh
 Tanveer Sadiq as Waqar
 Tabbasum Arif as Waqar's Wife
 Saleem Miraj as Mitho
 Gul as Salina's Friend
 Amjad Shani as Mr. Junaid
 Asifa Naureen as Jannat
 Nain Shehzadi as Jewna
 Kanwal Malik as Imamzadi
 Majid Moon as Afzal Khan
 Tahira Khan as Afzal's Wife
 Raheela Malik as Doctor
 Dr. Ajmal Malik as Police Officer
 Nighat Sultana as Manu's Mother
 Qamar Anjum as Sarkar's Driver

Soundtrack

There are four situational songs in this serial. Qawwali and music videos were recorded especially on original locations to keep the right atmosphere, showing mud houses in desert, Shrine, Cholistani dresses, camels, cows etc. Three songs were composed by Waqar Ali and lyricists was M Nasir & Ali Moin. Nirma has two performances in it and choreographed by Sonu Dangerous with his team.

Awards and nominations
8th Lux Style Awards 
 Nominated – Best TV Serial (2009).
 Nominated – Best TV Actor (2009) – Asif Raza Mir. And
 Nominated – Best TV Director (2009) – Kamran Qureshi.

References

External links
 
 Director's Website
 Facebook Page
 Imran Abbas on location
 Nirma on location
 Asif Raza Mir's interview
 Lux Style Awards 2009 Nominations
 Zainab Qayyum on location
 Seema Ghazal's interview
 Kashif Mehmood on location
 The Making Show
 Producers Humayun Saeed & Abdullah Kadwani's interview

ARY Digital original programming
Urdu-language television shows
Pakistani drama television series
Television shows set in Karachi
ARY Digital
Urdu-language television
2000s Pakistani television series
Serial drama television series
2007 Pakistani television series debuts
2007 Pakistani television series endings
7th Sky Entertainment